Menchie Beronilla Bernos (born Menchie Bernos, 30 August 1980) also known as Ching Bernos is a Filipina politician. She is currently serving as a member of the Philippine House of Representatives representing the Lone District of Abra since June 30, 2022. She previously served as mayor of La Paz, Abra from June 30, 2016, to June 30, 2022.

Political career

Mayor of La Paz (2016-2022)

Congressional career (2022-present) 
In the 2022 election, Bernos ran unopposed for the seat of Abra's lone congressional district, garnering 122,223 votes.

Electoral history

2016

2019

2022

References

External links 
 Official Facebook page

Living people
Members of the House of Representatives of the Philippines from Abra (province)
Nacionalista Party politicians
People from Abra (province)
1980 births